Venice Island is an island in the Sacramento-San Joaquin River Delta,  northwest of Stockton. It is in San Joaquin County, California, and managed by Reclamation District 2023.

It is owned by Barron Hilton and the DiNapoli family.

The  island is bounded on the north- and northeast by Potato Slough, on the southeast by Little Connection Slough, on the south by the Stockton Deepwater Channel Venice Cut, and on the west by the San Joaquin River-Stockton Deepwater Shipping Channel.

See also
List of islands of California

References

Islands of the Sacramento–San Joaquin River Delta
Islands of Northern California
Islands of San Joaquin County, California
Geography of the San Joaquin Valley
Islands of California